This article lists notable events and releases in the history of the Lego Group.

1890s
 1895:
 The woodworking shop, "Billund Woodworking and Carpenter's Shop", which would eventually evolve into the Lego company, was founded in Billund.

1910s
 1916:
 Ole Kirk Christiansen purchases the small woodworking shop in Billund.

1920s
 1920:
 Godtfred Kirk Christiansen is born.
 1924:
 Ole's shop burns down when a fire ignites some wood shavings. Ole then builds a larger workshop, renting out most of the space, and using the rest for his own shop.

1930s
 1932:
 Ole Kirk Christiansen's shop nearly goes bankrupt in the depression. With a lack of normal carpentry jobs, Ole Kirk starts producing toys, many of which were wooden pull toys.
 1934:
 The company name Lego is coined by Christiansen from the Danish phrase leg godt, meaning "play well".
 1935:
 The Lego Duck (a wooden toy) is featured.
 1937:
 Godtfred Kirk Christiansen starts creating models.
 1939:
 The company grows to 10 employees.

1940s
 1942:
 A fire breaks out in the factory, forcing the company to rebuild.
 1943:
 The company grows to 40 employees.
 1947:
 Ole purchases the first plastic moulding machine in Denmark, and the company begins manufacturing plastic toys.  The Christiansens are inspired by samples of the "Kiddicraft Self-Locking Building Brick", a design patented by the Briton Hilary Fisher Page. December 27 - Kjeld Kirk Kristiansen is born.
 1948:
 The company grows to 50 employees.
 1949:
 Lego begins producing similar plastic bricks, calling them "Automatic Binding Bricks."

1950s
 1951:
 The first ever film about Lego is shot. The photographer is Christian Lund, and the film is black and white with no sound.
 1953:
 Automatic Binding Bricks are renamed Lego Mursten, or "Lego Bricks."
 First baseplates are created.
 Godtfred Kirk Christiansen creates "system of play" that leads to the formation of Lego sets.
 1954:
 Godtfred Kirk Christiansen becomes junior managing director of Lego, and soon has the idea to turn Lego bricks into a toy system.
 Lego windows and doors are introduced.
 The word Lego is officially registered in Denmark.
 First beam bricks are released.
 1955:
 Lego releases its first toy "system" of the Town Plan along with 27 other sets.
 Lego bricks begin selling better, but are not yet the core Lego product.
 Lego first exports toys to Sweden.
 Godtfred Kirk Christiansen demonstrates the Lego bricks at a toy fair in Nuremberg, Germany.
 First Lego trees are released.
 1956:
 A sales company for Lego is built in Hohenwestedt, Germany.
 1957:
 Godtfred Kirk Christiansen is appointed managing director.
 First Lego flags, lights, and windows.
 1958:
 The Lego brick design is improved to allow better versatility and "locking" ability.
 Ole Kirk Christiansen dies; Godtfred inherits leadership of the Lego Company.
 The Workshop burnt down the third time.
 The Lego company patents the stud-and-tube coupling system. This new system makes models much more stable. Sloping roof tile bricks are featured.
 The company in Billund grows to 140 employees.
 1959:
 A small staff at Lego, the "Futura" division, is established to develop ideas for new sets.
 Lego begins selling its products in other countries such as Norway, Germany, Switzerland, and the UK.
 Lego France, British Lego Ltd., Lego Belgium and Lego Sweden are established.

1960s
 1960:
 February: Another warehouse fire consumes most of Lego inventory of wooden toys.
 Production of wooden toys is discontinued; the company changes its focus to the plastic building bricks.
 Lego Finland and Lego Netherlands are established.
 By the end of the year, the company grows to 450 employees.
 1961:
 The Lego wheel is introduced.
 Sales start in the United States and Canada through a license agreement with Samsonite Corp.
 Lego Italy established
 1961–1962:
 Lego makes an arrangement allowing Samsonite to begin producing and selling Lego products in Canada, an arrangement that would continue until 1988.
 1962:
 Lego sells toys in Singapore, Hong Kong, Australia, Morocco, and Japan.
 Lego 1/3 elements are introduced.
 1963:
 Cellulose acetate is abandoned in favor of the more stable ABS plastic in making Lego bricks.
 Samsonite begins producing Lego bricks under a  license in North America.
 Lego Austria is established.
 The Lego Group starts Modulex.
 1964:
 The first Lego sets containing instruction manuals are introduced.
 Lego sells toys in Lebanon.
 A production plant, Lego Werkzeugbau GmbH, is opened in Hohenwestedt, Germany.
 1965:
 The company in Billund grows to more than 600 employees.
 1966:
 One of Lego most successful series, the Lego train system is released. Initial train sets include a 4.5-volt motor and rails.
 Lego is now sold in 42 countries.
 1967:
 First Lego hinges.
 1968:
 Train sets with a 12-volt motor are introduced.
 On June 7, the Legoland Park in Billund is opened, at which 3,000 people visit on the opening day.
 Lego bricks with magnets are introduced.
 1969:
 The Duplo system, using larger bricks and targeting younger children but also compatible with existing Lego bricks, is released.
 The company in Billund grows to 843 employees.

1970s
 1970:
 The company grows to 1,000 employees.
 1971:
 Lego introduces furniture pieces and dollhouses for girls.
 1972:
 Lego adds boat and ship sets, with hull pieces that float.
 Lego Samsonite license agreement ends
 Lego USA established in Brookfield, Connecticut.
 1973:
 Lego USA moves to its present-day location in Enfield, Connecticut.
 All Lego products are placed under one logo, a red square with the word, Lego, in white bordered by black and yellow.
 Lego first sells toys to Hungary.
 Lego Portugal is established.
 The first known stop motion brickfilm is made.
 1974:
 Lego figures are launched, starting with the Lego family.
 Bricks and Pieces, the first official Lego newsletter, is introduced in the United Kingdom.
 Lego Spain is established.
 1975:
 The company grows to 2,500 employees.
 The Expert Series sets are introduced.
 1977:
 The Lego Technic (known as the Expert Builder) series is launched.
 Lego Town is launched.
 Lego Boats is launched.
 Kjeld Kirk Kristiansen joins the Lego Group management.
 Duplo people are introduced.
 1978:
 Lego introduces the minifigure with movable limbs and hands that can grasp utensils. This was the company's second most important design, after the brick itself.
 Lego Castle is introduced.
 Lego Space is introduced.
 1979:
 Kjeld Kirk Kristiansen becomes president of Lego.
 Lego introduces the Fabuland and Scala themes.
 Lego Singapore is established.

1980s
 1980:
 Lego establishes the Educational Products Department.
 New factories are opened in Switzerland and Jutland, Denmark.
 It is revealed in a survey that seventy percent of all Western European families with youngsters under the age of 14 years own Lego bricks.
 Lego train tracks are introduced.
 Lego Education was introduced.
 1981:
 The second generation of Lego trains is produced, including a wider variety of accessories.
 1982:
 Expert Builder series matures and becomes Technic.
 The Lego Group celebrates its 50th anniversary on August 13.
 The book, 50 years of play is published.
 Lego South Africa is established.
 First Lego wind-up engine.
 1983:
 Lego launches the Duplo Baby series.
 The company grows to 3,700 employees worldwide.
 1984:
 Lego Castle series is launched.
 Lego pneumatics are added to the Technic series.
 Lego Brazil is established.
 Lego Korea is established.
 1985:
 Lego company grows to 5,000 employees worldwide; 3,000 of them being in Billund.
 The gearstick is introduced.
 Danish Foreign Minister, Uffe Ellemann-Jensen, opens the LEGO Centre at Birkenhead Point in Sydney Australia, the first permanent LEGO shop outside Billund
 1986:
 Lego Technic robots controlled by computers are placed in schools.
 Light and Sound sets are launched of Lego Town and Space themes; these were the first products of the new-generation 9V "Electric System".
 Another factory in Manaus, Brazil is opened.
 Godtfred Kirk Christiansen resigns as chairman of the board of Lego System A/S and Lego Overseas.
 Kjeld Kirk Kristiansen takes over for Godtfred Kirk Christiansen.
 1987:
 Forestman, Crusaders, and Black Knights, sub-lines of Lego Castle, are introduced.
 Blacktron I and Futuron, sub-lines of Lego Space, are introduced.
 Lego reaches almost 6,000 employees.
 Lego South Africa is closed.
 Lego Club is established.
 1988:
 The first Lego World Cup building contest is held in Billund.
 Lego Canada is established.
 The "Brick Separator" is introduced.
 1989:
 Lego Pirates theme is launched.
 Lego Educational Products Department is renamed Lego Dacta.
 Brick Kicks, the first official Lego Club magazine, is introduced.
 Space Police I, a sub-line of Lego Space is introduced.

1990s
 1990
 Lego Model Team sets are released.
 Lego is one of the top 10 toy companies of 1990.
 Forestman is discontinued.
 The Blacktron I and Futuron themes are discontinued.
 Space Police I is discontinued.
 M:Tron, a sub-line of Lego Space is introduced.
 Lego Malaysia is established.
 The Duplo Zoo is launched.
 The 9V "Electric System" is now extended to the Technic range with new motors, replacing the old 4.5V/12V motors.
 1991
 9V Trains motors are made 9V to bring the system into line with the rest of the Lego range.
 Lego Paradisa is launched.
 Blacktron II, a sub-line of Lego Space is introduced.
 Imperial Guards, a sub-line of Lego Pirates is introduced.
 The company grows to 7,550 employees.
 1992
 Lego sets two Guinness World Records.
 Lego Castle and Lego Tower are released
 Paradisa and Duplo Toolo sets are introduced.
 On Swedish television, the world's largest Lego Castle is built.
 The Crusaders theme is discontinued.
 Wolfpack, a sub-line of Lego Castle is introduced.
 Space Police II, a sub-line of Lego Space is introduced.
 Lego Japan is established.
 Lego Hungary is established.
 The first Lego Imagination Center is opened in Mall of America (owned by Triple Five Group) in Bloomington, Minnesota, United States.
 1993
 Duplo introduces a train and a parrot-shaped "brickvac" that could scoop Lego pieces up off the floor.
 Space Police I is re-released.
 Wolfpack, a sub-line of Lego Castle is discontinued.
 Dragon Masters is introduced.
 M:Tron, a sub-line of Lego Space is discontinued.
 Blacktron II, a sub-line of Lego Space is discontinued.
 Space Police II, a sub-line of Lego Space is discontinued.
 Ice Planet 2002, a sub-line of Lego Space is introduced.
 Lego South Africa re-established.
 The orange transparent brick is introduced.
 1994
 The Black Knights theme is discontinued.
 Ice Planet 2002, a sub-line of Lego Space is discontinued.
 Unitron, a sub-line of Lego Space is introduced.
 Spyrius, a sub-line of Lego Space is introduced.
 Islanders, a sub-line of Lego Pirates is introduced.
 Lego Mexico is established.
 The company grows to 8,880 employees worldwide.
 First pink Lego bricks.
 Brick Kicks, the official Lego Club Magazine, is renamed Lego Mania Magazine.
 1995
 Lego Primo series is introduced.
 Lego Aquazone is introduced.
 Royal Knights, a sub-line of Lego Castle is introduced.
 Unitron is discontinued.
 Imperial Guards, a sub-line of Lego Pirates is discontinued.
 Lego TechBuild, a sub-line of Lego Technic is introduced.
 Lego TechPlay, another sub-line of Lego Technic is introduced.
 Godtfred Kirk Christiansen, son of the company's founder, dies.
 Lego Belgium and Lego Netherlands become Lego Benelux.
 Lego dolphin element is introduced.
 1996
 Legoland Windsor is opened in the United Kingdom.
 The Lego Watch System is launched.
 Lego Wild West is introduced.
 Lego.com is launched.
 Dark Forest, a sub-line of Lego Castle is introduced.
 Time Cruisers is introduced.
 Spyrius theme is discontinued.
 Exploriens, a sub-line of Lego Space is introduced.
 Imperial Armada, a sub-line of Lego Pirates is introduced.
 Legoland Billund reaches 25 million visitors since its opening in 1968.
 It is estimated that 180 billion Lego elements have been made and over 300 million people worldwide play with them.
 1997
 Lego launches its first computer game, Lego Island.
 Lego introduces fiber-optic elements.
 Lego Paradisa is discontinued.
 Lego Divers is introduced.
 Fright Knights, a sub-line of Lego Castle is introduced.
 Time Twisters, a sub-line of Time Cruisers is introduced.
 Roboforce, a sub-line of Lego Space is introduced.
 UFO, a sub-line of Lego Space is introduced.
 Aquaraiders, a sub-line of Lego Aquazone is introduced.
 1998
 Lego launches the Lego Creator, Loco, and Chess computer games.
 Lego introduces beige bricks.
 Lego Adventurers and Insectoids series are introduced.
 Lego releases Mindstorms, a programmable computerized brick with Lego-compatible sensors and motors.
 The red Lego logo introduced in 1973 is updated. It is a graphically tightened version of the logo used for the past 25 years.
 Lego rereleases the Crusaders, Black Knights, and Dragon Masters themes.
 Insectoids, a sub-line of Lego Space is introduced.
 Lego Cyberslam, is introduced.
 1999
 Legoland California opens in Carlsbad, California.
 Lego Rock Raiders series is introduced.
 Lego produces the first licensed theme with Lucasfilm - Star Wars
 UFO and Insectoids themes are discontinued.
 Jungle a sub-line of Lego Adventurers is introduced.
 Lego Underground is introduced.
 Lego Slizers (Throwbots) are introduced.
 Lego Education is introduced.

2000s
 2000
 Knights' Kingdom, Life on Mars, and Soccer/Football are introduced.
 Dino Island, a sub-line of Lego Adventurers is introduced, then discontinued. RoboRiders are also introduced, then discontinued.
 Lego Underground (Rock Raiders) and Lego Throwbots are discontinued.
 Lego Studios is introduced.
 The British Association of Toy Retailers names the Lego brick "Toy of the Century".
 Lego Bionicle is launched in Europe and Australasia.
 2001
 Lego Bionicle is launched in the United States and worldwide.
 Lego Brand Retail stores are opened in England, Germany, and Russia.
 Lego Life on Mars is introduced, then discontinued.
 Lego Alpha Team and Lego Harry Potter are introduced.
 Lego Serious Play is unveiled.
 Lego Jack Stone is introduced.
 Jorgen Vig Knudstorp joined The LEGO Group
 2002
 Company slogan changes from "Just Imagine..." to "Play On".
 Lego Wild West is discontinued.
 Lego Island Xtreme Stunts, Spider-Man, and Lego Racers are introduced.
 Lego Mania Magazine issues are changed to Lego Magazine.
 Legoland Germany opened May 17, 2002 in Günzburg.
 Lego Galidor is introduced.
 2003
 Lego introduces new skin tones for mini-figures based on actual people.
 Clikits, Lego Designer, Lego Hockey, Lego Basketball, and Lego Gravity Games are introduced.
 Orient Expedition, a sub-line of Adventurers is introduced.
 Lego 4+ known as Lego 4 Juniors is introduced.
 Lego Island Xtreme Stunts is discontinued.
 Lego Inventor is introduced, then discontinued.
 Lego World City is introduced.
 Lego minifigure celebrates its 25th birthday.
 The first full-length CGI LEGO movie, Bionicle: Mask of Light is released.
 2004
 Lego celebrates the fiftieth anniversary of the Lego System.
 Lego Quatro brick is introduced for children ages 1–3.
 Lego Knights' Kingdom II is introduced.
 Orient Expedition, a sub-line of Lego Adventurers is discontinued.
 Lego Spider-Man, Lego World City, and Lego Gravity Games are discontinued.
 Lego Group reports record loss for 2003 fiscal year.
 The colors Dark Stone Grey (199), Medium Stone Grey (194) and Bright Purple (221) replaces Dark Grey, Grey and Medium Reddish Violet, respectively.
 The color Medium Lilac (268) is introduced.
 Jorgen Vig Knudstorp is appointed CEO of The LEGO Group (The first non-family CEO in Lego history).
 The second full-length CGI LEGO movie, Bionicle 2: Legends of Metru Nui is released.
 2005
 Lego System celebrates its 50th anniversary.
 Lego Group sells Legoland parks to Merlin Entertainments Group.
 Lego Alpha Team is discontinued.
 Lego City is introduced.
 Lego Dino Attack/Dino 2010 is introduced.
 Lego Vikings is introduced.
 The third full-length CGI LEGO movie, Bionicle 3: Web of Shadows is released.
 2006
 Lego Exo-Force is introduced.
 Lego Batman is introduced.
 Avatar: The Last Airbender is introduced then discontinued.
 Lego SpongeBob SquarePants is introduced.
 Lego Sports is reintroduced.
 Remote control (RC) trains are introduced.
 Lego Mindstorms NXT 1.0 is released.
 Lego Quatro is discontinued.
 The color Medium Azure is introduced.
 2007
 Lego Aqua Raiders, and Mars Mission are introduced.
 Lego Castle is reintroduced.
 Lego 9V trains discontinued.
 Lego Aqua Raiders is discontinued.
 2008
 On January 28, 2008, Lego celebrated the 50th anniversary of the patent on its interlocking blocks.
 Lego Mindstorms celebrates its tenth anniversary.
 Lego minifigure celebrates its 30th birthday.
 Lego Architecture is introduced
 Lego Indiana Jones, Speed Racer, and Agents are introduced.
 Lego Exo-Force is discontinued.
 Mars Mission is discontinued.
 Speed racer is discontinued
 2009
 Lego Mindstorms NXT 2.0 is released.
 Agents 2.0 is released.
 Lego Star Wars' tenth anniversary.
 Legoland California tenth anniversary.
 Lego Power Miners is introduced.
 Lego Ninjago Concept of the theme were created by Creators
 Lego Pirates is reintroduced.
 Lego Batman is discontinued.
 Lego Games are introduced.
 Lego Space Police III is introduced.
 Lego Muji is introduced.

2010s
 2010
 Lego Ben 10: Alien Force is introduced.
 Lego Atlantis is introduced.
 Lego Toy Story is introduced.
 Duplo Cars is introduced.
 Lego Harry Potter is reintroduced.
 Lego Prince of Persia is introduced.
 Lego Hero Factory is introduced
 Lego Space Police III is discontinued.
 Lego World Racers is introduced.
 Lego Kingdoms is introduced.
 Lego Bionicle is discontinued.
 Lego Universe is launched.
 Lego Minifigures Series 1 and 2.
 2011
 Lego Minifigures Series 3, 4 and 5.
 Lego Ninjago is introduced.
 Lego Cars 2 is introduced.
 Lego Pirates of the Caribbean.
 Lego Alien Conquest is introduced.
 Lego Power Miners is discontinued.
 Lego SpongeBob SquarePants is reintroduced.
 Duplo Winnie The Pooh is introduced.
 Lego Life of George is introduced.
 Lego City Space theme is reintroduced.
 Lego Master Builders Academy (MBA) is introduced.
 Legoland Florida opens.
 Lego Pharaoh's Quest is discontinued.
 Lego Harry Potter is discontinued.
 The color Olive Green (330) is introduced as part of Lego Cars.
 Lego Super Heroes theme is introduced.
 2012
 The Lego Group celebrates their eightieth anniversary.
 Lego Universe is discontinued.
 Lego Dino is introduced.
 Lego Minifigures Series 6, 7 and 8.
 Legoland Malaysia opens.
 Lego Friends theme is introduced.
 Lego Monster Fighters is introduced.
 Lego Disney Princess is introduced.
 Lego Alien Conquest is discontinued.
 Lego Build and Rebuild is introduced.
 Lego The Lord of the Rings is introduced.
 Lego The Hobbit is introduced.
 The colors Dark Azure (321), Medium Azure (322), Aqua (323), Medium Lavender (324), Lavender (325), are introduced as part of the Friends theme.
 The color Spring Yellowish Green (326) is introduced as part of Disney Princess.
 2013
 Lego Minifigures Series 9, 10 and 11.
 Lego Galaxy Squad is introduced.
 Lego Ninjago is discontinued
 Lego Legends of Chima is introduced.
 Lego Mindstorms EV3 is introduced.
 Duplo Mickey Mouse & Friends is introduced.
 Lego Teenage Mutant Ninja Turtles is introduced.
 Lego The Lone Ranger is introduced.
 2014
 Lego celebrates the sixtieth anniversary of the Lego System.
 Lego Mixels is introduced.
 Lego Minifigures Series 12 is introduced.
 Lego Ninjago is re-introduced.
 The Lego Movie, released theatrically in movie cinemas on February 7, 2014.
 Lego thirtieth anniversary of Ghostbusters is introduced. Ecto-1.
 The Lego Movie (Lego theme) is introduced.
 Lego Fusion is introduced.
 Lego The Simpsons is introduced.
 Lego Ultra Agents is introduced.
 Lego The Hobbit is discontinued.
 2015
 Lego Minifigures Series 13 and 14.
 Lego Bionicle is reintroduced.
 Lego Speed Champions is introduced.
 Lego Scooby-Doo is released.
 Warner Bros announce that there would be a LEGO Batman Movie and a sequel to The LEGO Movie.
 Lego Jurassic World is released.
 2016
 Lego Nexo Knights is introduced
 Lego Minifigures Series 15 and 16.
 Lego Ghostbusters is introduced.
 Lego Stranger Things is introduced.
 Lego DC Super Hero Girls is introduced.
 Lego The Angry Birds Movie sets are released.
 Lego BrickHeadz is introduced. 
 Lego Bionicle reboot is discontinued.
 Lego Ninjago celebrate fifth anniversary with TV Halloween Special.
 2017
 The Lego Batman Movie Minifigures Series
 The Lego Batman Movie released in Cinemas, distributed by Warner Bros.
 The Lego Batman Movie (Lego theme) is introduced.
 Lego Minifigures Series 17 is introduced.
 The Lego Ninjago Movie released in Cinemas on September 22, 2017.
 The Lego Ninjago Movie Video Game releases on PS4, Xbox One and, Microsoft Windows on September 22, 2017.
 The Lego Ninjago Movie (Lego theme) is introduced.
 It is revealed that Unikitty, a character from The Lego Movie, would have her own TV show on Cartoon Network, titled "Unikitty!".
 Jorgen Vig Knurdstrom steps down as CEO and Bali Padda is appointed CEO on 1 January 2017
 Bali Padda steps down as CEO and Niels B. Christiansen is appointed new CEO 1 October 2017
 The social media app Lego Life is launched.
 2018
 Lego celebrates the fiftieth anniversary of the Lego minifigure.
 Lego J.K. Rowling's Wizarding World, a new name for the Lego Harry Potter theme, is re-introduced.
 Lego Unikitty! is introduced.
 Lego The Powerpuff Girls is introduced.
 Lego Overwatch is introduced.
 2019
 Lego City Sky Police is introduced.
 The Lego Movie 2: The Second Part released in Cinemas on February 8, 2019.
 The Lego Movie 2 (Lego theme) is introduced.
 It is announced that Warner Bros. to sell rights to The Lego Movie franchise to Universal Pictures.
 Lego Hidden Side is introduced.

2020s
 2020
 Lego Trolls World Tour is introduced.
 Lego Minions: The Rise of Gru is introduced.
 Lego Super Mario is introduced.
 Lego Monkie Kid is introduced.
 Lego DOTS is introduced.
 Lego Art is introduced.
 Lego Brick Sketches is introduced.
 Lego Ghostbusters is discontinued.
 Lego Hidden Side is discontinued.
 Lego Star Wars 20th Anniversary.
 It was revealed that the deal with Universal was set 5-years deal for The Lego Movie franchise.
 2021
 Lego Vidiyo is introduced.
 Lego Trolls World Tour is discontinued.
 Lego Ninjago theme celebrate tenth anniversary with upcoming Seasons.
 2022
 The Lego Group celebrates their ninetieth anniversary.
 Lego Vidiyo is discontinued.
 Lego Friends theme celebrate tenth anniversary of building friendships and future creators.
 Lego Avatar is introduced.

References

 50 Years of Play - Internal Lego publication from 1982
 The World of LEGO Toys, Henry Wiencek, 1987

External links
 Timeline on the official Lego website

Culture-related timelines
Timeline
Company timelines